Orslow is an upland hamlet in Staffordshire, England,  north-east of Great Chatwell. Its Anglo-Saxon name means 'Horsa's burial mound'. Of note in Orslow is the site of a 13th-century windmill (close to SJ 818156) and Orslow Manor, a red brick farmhouse of about 1800.

See also
Listed buildings in Blymhill and Weston-under-Lizard

References
 Raven, Michael, A Guide to Staffordshire and the Black Country, Michael Raven, 2004, 0906114330.

Hamlets in Staffordshire
South Staffordshire District